The Chipping Norton Islands consist of four small lake islands that are found within Chipping Norton Lake in western Sydney, New South Wales, Australia.

Geography
The four islets, which belong to different suburbs, include:  
Bass Island - Situated in the west towards Cabramatta
Bulba-Gong (Wildlife Reserve Island) - Located in the eastern part of the lake within Chipping Norton and is the largest
Crescent Island - Strip-shaped, located in the northwest part of the lake towards Lansvale
Daruk Island - Found in the centre of the lake to the east and is the most distant to land, but within the bounds of Chipping Norton

Description
The islands are within Liverpool City Council and Fairfield City Council local government areas. Straddling Georges River, they are mostly made up of native wildlife that serve as a refuge for endemic birds. The islands are accessible by boat, though visitor access is prohibited. 

Daruk Island is named after the Darug people, an Aboriginal tribe native to Sydney. “Bulba-gong” means 'island' and 'bird', respectively, in the Eora language.

Ecology
There are over fifty different kinds of birds found around the lake, which would visit or inhabit the islands, such as Australian pelicans, Australasian swamphens, egrets, maned ducks, pacific black ducks, sacred ibis, and pardalote. Dolphin and sharks are usually spotted in the surrounding waters.

The woodlands of the region feature sedgelands, reeds and mangroves. Native trees include the swamp oak, forest red gum, blue box, grey box, bangalay and rough-barked apple. The alluvial woodland vegetation is another striking feature of the lake as it is an endangered ecological community.

References

Islands of Sydney
Nature reserves in New South Wales
City of Liverpool (New South Wales)
City of Fairfield
Lake islands of Australia
Archipelagoes of Australia